jj n° 2 is the debut studio album by Swedish indie pop band JJ. It was released on the Swedish record label Sincerely Yours on 1 July 2009. A vinyl edition, titled jj n° 2.1, was released in late December 2009.

Reception

jj n° 2 received a "Best New Music" designation from Pitchfork. At the end of 2009, Paste named jj n° 2 "The Year's Greatest Musical Obscurity", and The Washington Post named it the second best pop album of the year, behind Maxwell's BLACKsummers'night.

jj n° 2 was ranked by several publications on lists of the best albums of 2009, including at number nine by Gorilla vs. Bear, at number 35 by Pitchfork, and at number 56 by PopMatters.

Track listing

Notes
"Ecstasy" uses elements of "Lollipop" by Lil Wayne featuring Static Major.

References

2009 albums
JJ (Swedish band) albums
Secretly Canadian albums